The Battle of the Lisaine, also known as the Battle of Héricourt, was fought from 15 January to 17 January 1871 between German and French forces.  The French were led by Charles Denis Bourbaki, and were attempting to relieve the Siege of Belfort. The Germans prepared XIV Corps and several other divisions, some 40,000–45,000 men, to halt the French advance of about 110,000 men. The Germans had their outer posts overran quite swiftly but the Prussians forced back and counterattacked the French forces, breaking the morale of French troops and leaving them to either die or retreat. In the end their efforts failed, and they were forced to flee into Switzerland where they were all interned soon after.

Citations

References
 
 

Battles of the Franco-Prussian War
Battles in Bourgogne-Franche-Comté
History of Haute-Saône
1871 in France
January 1871 events